

Events
Rival newspapers William Randolph Hearst's Chicago American and the Chicago Tribune extend contracts through Moses Annenberg to street gangs such as Ragen's Colts, under the guise of "athletic clubs", in which newsdealers and vendors are intimidated into selling a specific newspaper. During the three-year period known as the "Circulation Wars", 27 street vendors are stabbed, beaten or shot as many of the future Prohibition gangsters and other criminals of Chicago's underworld become involved, including Dean O'Banion.
New York police arrest over 200 known Italian gangsters and known Black Hand members in a raid in Little Italy, including Morello crime family leader Lupo the Wolf. However, none are convicted as many of the notes of extortion threats cannot be traced to them.
Chicago racketeer James "Big Jim" Colosimo brings his nephew Johnny Torrio, then with New York City's Five Points Gang, to eliminate the Black Hand from the city in response to their extortion demands. Within a month, ten Black Hand extortionists had been killed.
Jim Cosmano, a major Chicago Black Hand leader, is severely wounded in an ambush by Johnny Torrio on a South Side bridge. Cosmano had previously demanded $10,000 threatening to destroy Colosimo's cafe.
Gas House Gang member William Jones is imprisoned.
Eastman Gang leader Chick Tricker's Park Row dive bar is closed by the New York City Committee of Fourteen. However he moves his operations, purchasing Dan the Dude's Stag Cafe on West 28th Street, later renaming it the Cafe Maryland.
January 1 – March 26, 1911 – Thirty-eight Black Hand victims are killed by Black Hand assassins, many by the unidentified assassin known only as Shotgun Man, between Oak Street and Milton Street in Chicago's Little Italy.
April 1 – Spanish Louie, a lieutenant of Humpty Jackson, is killed while walking on East 11th Street by an unknown gunman (although other sources have incorrectly claimed 1900 and 1911).

Births
Frank Abbandando "The Dasher", Murder, Inc. "hitman"
Albert Facchiano, "Chinky" Genovese crime family member
February 6 – Carlos Marcello [Calagero Menacore], New Orleans Mafia Don
February 21 – Carmine Galante "Lilo"/"The Cigar", Bonanno crime family Don
May 11 – Angelo Bruno "The Gentle Don"/"The Docile Don", Philadelphia Mafia leader
October 1 – Bonnie Parker, sidekick and lover of Clyde Barrow

Deaths
April 1 – Spanish Louie, New York gangster and member of the Humpty Jackson Gang.

References

Years in organized crime
Organized crime